Uzbekistan competed at the 2014 Summer Youth Olympics, in Nanjing, China from 16 August to 28 August 2014.

Boxing

Uzbekistan qualified three boxers based on its performance at the 2014 AIBA Youth World Championships

Boys

Canoeing

Uzbekistan qualified one boat based on its performance at the 2013 World Junior Canoe Sprint and Slalom Championships.

Boys

Gymnastics

Artistic Gymnastics

Uzbekistan qualified two athletes based on its performance at the 2014 Asian Artistic Gymnastics Championships.

Boys

Girls

Rhythmic Gymnastics

Uzbekistan qualified one individual and one team based on its performance at the 2014 Asian Rhythmic Championships.

Individual

Team

Trampoline

Uzbekistan qualified one athlete based on its performance at the 2014 Asian Trampoline Championships.

Judo

Uzbekistan qualified one athlete based on its performance at the 2013 Cadet World Judo Championships.

Individual

Team

Rowing

Uzbekistan qualified two boats based on its performance at the Asian Qualification Regatta.

Qualification Legend: FA=Final A (medal); FB=Final B (non-medal); FC=Final C (non-medal); FD=Final D (non-medal); SA/B=Semifinals A/B; SC/D=Semifinals C/D; R=Repechage

Shooting

Uzbekistan qualified two shooters based on its performance at the 2014 Asian Shooting Championships.

Individual

Team

Swimming

Uzbekistan qualified two swimmers.

Boys

Table Tennis

Uzbekistan qualified one athlete based on its performance at the Asian qualifying event.

Singles

Team

Qualification Legend: Q=Main Bracket (medal); qB=Consolation Bracket (non-medal)

Taekwondo

Uzbekistan qualified one athlete based on its performance at the Taekwondo Qualification Tournament.

Girls

Weightlifting

Uzbekistan qualified 2 quotas in the boys' events based on the team ranking after the 2013 Weightlifting Youth World Championships. Later Uzbekistan would qualify 1 quota in the girls' events based on the team ranking after the 2014 Weightlifting Youth & Junior Asian Championships.

Boys

Girls

Wrestling

Uzbekistan qualified three athletes based on its performance at the 2014 Asian Cadet Championships.

Boys

Girls

See also
Uzbekistan at the 2014 Winter Olympics

References

2014 in Uzbekistani sport
Nations at the 2014 Summer Youth Olympics
Uzbekistan at the Youth Olympics